Mece is a settlement in the region of Baranja, Croatia. Administratively, it is located in the Darda municipality within the Osijek-Baranja County. Population is 882 people.

See also
Osijek-Baranja County
Baranja

References 

Populated places in Osijek-Baranja County
Baranya (region)